"Mundian To Bach Ke", also titled "Beware of the Boys (Mundian To Bach Ke)" or "Beware", is a bhangra music song produced by British musician Panjabi MC, with vocals and lyrics by Punjabi artist Labh Janjua. The song was produced by Panjabi MC in Birmingham, England, for his 1998 album Legalised.

Following its release as a single in November 2002, "Mundian To Bach Ke" achieved worldwide success, topping the singles charts in Italy and Wallonia and charting highly in many other countries. A remix of the song, released in 2003 and featuring American rapper Jay-Z, also charted highly in North America and Australia. The song sold an estimated  copies worldwide, making it one of the best-selling singles of all time.

Lyrics and music

In addition to features of bhangra music, "Mundian To Bach Ke" also uses the bass line and part of the beat from "Fire It Up" (1997) by Busta Rhymes, which in turn is based around a sample from the television theme song for Knight Rider, written by Glen A. Larson and Stu Phillips, as an underlying element and lyrics originally written by Channi Singh. The lyrics of the song are in Punjabi. The video of this song was shot in the streets of Kuala Lumpur, Malaysia.

Chart performance
"Mundian To Bach Ke" was released as a single in Germany on 25 November 2002. It sold over 100,000 in the first two days alone and debuted at number two on the German Singles Chart. On the Italian Singles Chart, the song reached number one for three weeks. In the UK, it was issued through Instant Karma and debuted at its peak of number five on the UK Singles Chart; it was the first bhangra song to reach the UK top 10. The remix, featuring American rapper Jay-Z, also reached number 33 on the US Billboard Hot 100, number 10 in Canada, and number 12 in Australia.

The Washington Post estimated that there may have been 10 million units sold worldwide. However, given that many of these copies may have been bootlegged, an exact number is not known, though sales are at least in the millions.

Track listings

German CD single
 "Mundian To Bach Ke" (original mix) – 3:49
 "Mundian To Bach Ke" (Moonbootica mix) – 6:41
 "Mundian To Bach Ke" (Banks & Sullivan Oldskool mix) – 4:39
 "Mundian To Bach Ke" (instrumental mix) – 4:43

French CD single
 "Mundian To Bach Ke" (original radio edit) – 3:24
 "Mundian To Bach Ke" (Motivo Hi-Lectro radio edit) – 3:25

UK CD single
 "Mundian To Bach Ke" (radio edit) – 3:20
 "Mundian To Bach Ke" (Switch mix) – 6:19
 "Mundian Breaks" – 3:56

UK 12-inch single
A1. "Mundian To Bach Ke" (main mix) – 4:02
B1. "Mundian To Bach Ke" (Switch mix) – 6:19
B2. "Mundian Breaks" – 3:56

UK cassette single
 "Mundian To Bach Ke" (main mix) – 4:02
 "Mundian Breaks" – 3:56

US CD single and 12-inch single 1
 "Beware of the Boys (Mundian To Bach Ke)" (Jay-Z remix)
 "Beware of the Boys (Mundian To Bach Ke)" (original version)
 "Beware Breaks (Mundian Breaks)"

US 12-inch single 2
A1. "Beware of the Boys (Mundian To Bach Ke)" (radio edit)
A2. "Beware Breaks (Mundian Breaks)"
B1. "Beware of the Boys (Mundian To Bach Ke)" (Switch mix)

US 12-inch single 3
A1. "Beware of the Boys (Mundian To Bach Ke)" (Twista remix)
A2. "Beware of the Boys (Mundian To Bach Ke)" (original version)
B1. "Beware Breaks (Mundian Breaks)"

Australian CD single
 "Mundian To Bach Ke (Beware of the Boys)" (Jay-Z remix radio edit) – 3:00
 "Mundian To Bach Ke (Beware of the Boys)" (original radio edit) – 3:21
 "Mundian To Bach Ke (Beware of the Boys)" (Triple X remix) – 7:53
 "Mundian To Bach Ke (Beware of the Boys)" (Motiva Hi-Lectro mix) – 5:40
 "Beware Breaks (Mundian Breaks)" – 3:56

Charts

Weekly charts

Year-end charts

Certifications

Release history

In popular culture

 "Mundian To Bach Ke" is used frequently in western media when Indian characters are introduced or are on screen. It was used on an episode of ER, when Gallant and Neela danced to a version of the song, which Gallant called a "Sikh rap".
 "Mundian To Bach Ke" was used in America's Best Dance Crew Season 2 on week 9 of the Around The World challenge as part of the Indian dance section. It also appeared in an episode of the American television show Queer as Folk during a scene at the club Babylon. A version of this song was used as a background music in the Ginebra San Miguel "Bilog Ang Mundo" ad campaigns in 2003. The song was featured in an episode of Entourage. It was used twice in the pilot of the NBC comedy Outsourced.
 "Mundian To Bach Ke" was featured in the 2003 film Bulletproof Monk.
 "Mundian To Bach Ke" was the song used by Derek Hough and Shawn Johnson in their Knight Rider bhangra-themed dance in the semi-finals of Dancing with the Stars (All Stars Season).
 The remix of "Mundian To Bach Ke", which featured American rapper Jay-Z, also on Dharma Records, was featured in the trailer for the 2012 American film The Dictator, as the film's main theme song.
 Sports-comedy Stick It featured the beginning of "Mundian To Bach Ke" in a scene where a group of teens escapes from the arriving police.
 "Mundian To Bach Ke" was used in the dance games Dance Central 3 and Just Dance 4.
 "Mundian To Bach Ke" was used in the Bollywood film Boom (2003).
 In 2009, German singer Peter Fox mashed this song with Seeed's song "Dickes B" during the tour for his solo album Stadtaffe.
 In 2015, it was featured in series 2, episode 2 of the BBC sitcom Scot Squad as two officers did the 'clocking off' dance.
 "Mundian To Bach Ke" was recreated in the Bollywood film Baaghi 2, with lyrics rewritten in Hindi.
 "Mundian To Bach Ke" was featured on Beyoncé and Jay-Z's joint On the Run II Tour, mashed up with Beyoncé's "Baby Boy".
 "Mundian To Bach Ke" was used on the June 2019 Edexcel GCSE Music Paper. It featured on the Section B essay along with the track "Release" by Afro Celt Sound System.
"Mundian To Bach Ke", featuring Jay-Z, appears on the soundtrack of the 2021 Netflix movie The White Tiger.
"Mundian To Bach Ke" was used as part of a dance scene within the Closing Ceremony of the Birmingham 2022 Commonwealth Games.
"Mundian To Bach Ke" in the 21st century was a part of some internet memes, with a video uploaded on YouTube of the song in the extremely loud version titled "loud indian music". The video became popular and featured characters either singing the song or yelling the song.

References

1998 songs
2002 singles
2003 singles
Instant Karma (record label) singles
Number-one singles in Greece
Number-one singles in Hungary
Number-one singles in Italy
Panjabi MC songs
Punjabi-language songs
UK Independent Singles Chart number-one singles
Ultratop 50 Singles (Wallonia) number-one singles